The 2010 Conference USA men's basketball tournament took place March 10–13, 2010, at the BOK Center in Tulsa, Oklahoma. The tournament was won by #7 seed Houston who receives an automatic bid to the NCAA tournament. All Quarterfinal and semifinal games were broadcast on CBS College Sports and the championship game was broadcast on CBS. Houston's Kelvin Lewis was declared the tournament's MVP.  Houston's Aubrey Coleman, Southern Mississippi's Gary Flowers, and UTEP's Randy Culpepper and Arnett Moultrie joined Lewis on the all-tournament team.

Bracket

Asterisk denotes game ended in overtime.
Rankings from the AP poll.

References

Tournament
Conference USA men's basketball tournament
Basketball competitions in Tulsa, Oklahoma
Conference USA men's basketball tournament
Conference USA men's basketball tournament
College sports tournaments in Oklahoma